Larry Harold Hopkins (born March 17, 1954 in Oshawa, Ontario) was a professional ice hockey player who played 60 games in the National Hockey League.  He played with the Winnipeg Jets and Toronto Maple Leafs.

In 1982 O-Pee-Chee mistakenly put a picture of Hopkins on the rookie card of teammate Paul MacLean.

Career statistics

Regular season and playoffs

References

External links
 

1954 births
Living people
Atlanta Flames draft picks
Canadian ice hockey left wingers
Dallas Black Hawks players
Ice hockey people from Ontario
Oshawa Generals players
Saginaw Gears players
Sherbrooke Jets players
Sportspeople from Oshawa
Toronto Maple Leafs players
Toronto Varsity Blues ice hockey players
Tulsa Oilers (1964–1984) players
Winnipeg Jets (1979–1996) players